The 2003–04 1. FC Nürnberg season happened from 4 August 2003 to 23 May 2004.

Season review
The 2003–04 1. FC Nürnberg season started on 4 August 2003 against Karlsruher SC. Nürnberg won 3–2.

Results

2. Bundesliga

Results summary

2. Bundesliga results

DFB-Pokal

Squad statistics

Matches played and goals scored

|}

Bookings

References

1. FC Nürnberg seasons